Dwight Henry Sloan (April 7, 1914 – March 18, 1998) was an American football quarterback in the National Football League. He played for the Chicago Cardinals and Detroit Lions. He played college football for the Arkansas Razorbacks.

References

1914 births
1998 deaths
American football quarterbacks
Chicago Cardinals players
Detroit Lions players
Arkansas Razorbacks football players
People from Crawford County, Arkansas
Players of American football from Arkansas